Cupressocrinitidae is an extinct family of crinoid from the Middle to Late Devonian. Cupressocrinites is a representative of this family.

References

External links 
Cupressocrinitidae in the Paleobiology Database

Prehistoric echinoderm families
Cladida
Middle Devonian first appearances
Late Devonian animals
Late Devonian extinctions